Jalalgarh Fort is an almost 300 years old ruined fort located at 20 km north of Purnia, Bihar, India. The fort was built by Saif Khan, the Faujdar of Purnea in 1722.

Structure 
The fort is a large quadrangular structure and has high walls which helped to protect the wall from Nepalese invasion. The fort is an embodiment of the beauty of Islamic architecture.

Restoration 
In January 2012, Bihar Chief Minister Nitish Kumar announced that Government of Bihar would be restoring and repairing the fort. He ordered Purnia district authorities to do this restoration work.

References 
 

Forts in Bihar
Archaeological sites in Bihar
Purnia district
1722 establishments in India
Buildings and structures completed in 1722